Brian Abbas Amidu (born 21 May 1990) is a Zimbabwean footballer who plays as a forward the Zimbabwe national football team.

Career

Kaizer Chiefs
After a two-week trial at the club in early 2012, Amidu joined South African club Kaizer Chiefs. After struggling with injuries, Amidu left the club in August of that year, failing to make an official appearance.

International
Amidu made his senior international debut on 6 February 2013 in a 2-1 friendly victory over Botswana.

International Goals
Scores and results list Zimbabwe's goal tally first.

References

External links

1990 births
Living people
Black Mambas F.C. players
Kaizer Chiefs F.C. players
Black Leopards F.C. players
CAPS United players
El Entag El Harby SC players
Arar FC players
Zimbabwe Premier Soccer League players
South African Premier Division players
National First Division players
Egyptian Premier League players
Saudi Second Division players
Zimbabwean footballers
Zimbabwe international footballers
Expatriate footballers in Iraq
Zimbabwean expatriate sportspeople in Iraq
Expatriate footballers in Egypt
Zimbabwean expatriate sportspeople in Egypt
Expatriate footballers in Saudi Arabia
Zimbabwean expatriate sportspeople in Saudi Arabia
Zimbabwean expatriate footballers
Association football forwards
Sportspeople from Harare